Bystřice is a town in Benešov District in the Central Bohemian Region of the Czech Republic. It has about 4,500 inhabitants.

Administrative parts
Villages of Božkovice, Drachkov, Hlivín, Hůrka, Jarkovice, Jeleneč, Jinošice, Jírovice, Jiřín, Kobylí a Plchov, Líšno, Líštěnec, Mlýny, Mokrá Lhota, Nesvačily, Opřetice, Ouběnice, Petrovice, Radošovice, Semovice, Strženec, Tožice, Tvoršovice, Vojslavice and Zahořany are administrative parts of Bystřice.

Geography
It lies mostly in the Benešov Uplands. The Konopišťský Stream flows through the town and supplies several ponds.

History
The first written mention of Bystřice is from 1352. It was probably founded between 1258 and 1278 as a market village on a trade route. it was promoted to a market town by King George of Poděbrady in 1471. In 1999, Bystřice became a town.

Demographics

Sights

The Church of Saints Simon and Jude is originally a Gothic church, rebuilt in the Baroque style.

The Líšno Castle is located in the village of Líšno. It was founded around 1367. It was completely rebuilt in the Romantic style in 1873–1884 and the castle park was founded. Since 2015, the castle has been privately owned. It serves social and cultural purposes.

Notable people
Stanislav Čeček (1886–1930), general
Zdeněk Štěpánek (1896–1968), actor

References

External links

Cities and towns in the Czech Republic
Populated places in Benešov District